ARHGAP11B is a human-specific gene that amplifies basal progenitors, controls neural progenitor proliferation, and contributes to neocortex folding. It is capable of causing neocortex folding in mice. This likely reflects a role for ARHGAP11B in development and evolutionary expansion of the human neocortex, a conclusion consistent with the finding that the gene duplication that created ARHGAP11B occurred on the human lineage after the divergence from the chimpanzee lineage but before the divergence from Neanderthals.

Structure 

ARHGAP11B encodes 267 amino acids. A truncated copy of ARHGAP11A, which is found throughout the animal kingdom and encodes a Rho GTPase-activating-protein (RhoGAP domain), ARHGAP11B comprises most of the GAP domain (until lysine-220), followed by a novel C-terminal sequence that lacks the 756 C-terminal amino acids of ARHGAP11A.

Activity 
In contrast to full-length ARHGAP11A and ARHGAP11A 1-250, ARHGAP11B, like ARHGAP11A1-220, did not exhibit RhoGAP activity in a RhoA/Rho-kinase–based cell transfection assay. This indicates that the C-terminal 47 amino-acids of ARHGAP11B (after lysine-220) constitute not only a unique sequence, resulting from a frameshifting deletion, but also are functionally distinct from their counterpart in ARHGAP11A. In this assay, co-expression of ARHGAP11B along with ARHGAP11A did not inhibit the latter's RhoGAP activity.

Function 
ARHGAP11B is involved in neocortex folding; however, its precise function remains unknown. Several genes involved in intellectual disability encode proteins with RhoGAP domains or other proteins in the Rho signalling pathway. It has been reported that it is located in mitochondria, where it binds to the adenine nucleotide translocator. It does not affect the adenine nucleotide exchange activity of the translocator, but it does lead to delayed opening of the mitochondrial permeability transition pore, thus allowing for greater sequestration of calcium. Furthermore, the presence of ARHGAP11B in the mitochondria boosts glutaminolysis, most likely due to the ability of mitochondria to sequester calcium, thereby activating mitochondrial matrix dehydrogenases in the citric acid cycle, particularly the oxoglutarate dehydrogenase complex.

Human evolution 

Changes in ARHGAP11B are one of several key genetic factors of recent brain evolution and difference of modern humans to (other) apes and Neanderthals. A 2016 study suggests, one mutation, a "single nucleotide substitution underlies the specific properties of ARHGAP11B that likely contributed to the evolutionary expansion of the human neocortex".

References

Further reading 

 
 

Human evolution